Notocytharella is a genus of sea snails, marine gastropod mollusks in the family Mangeliidae.

Species
Species within the genus Notocytharella include :
 Notocytharella phaethusa (Dall, 1919)
 Notocytharella striosa (Adams C. B., 1852)
Species brought into synonymy
 Notocytharella hastula H.A. Pilsbry & H.N. Lowe, 1932: synonym of Notocytharella striosa  (C.B. Adams, 1852)
 Notocytharella kwangdangensis (M.M. Schepman, 1913): synonym of Otitoma kwandangensis (M.M. Schepman, 1913)
 Notocytharella niobe (Dall, 1919): synonym of Notocytharella striosa  (C.B. Adams, 1852)

References

 Bouchet P., Kantor Yu.I., Sysoev A. & Puillandre N. (2011) A new operational classification of the Conoidea. Journal of Molluscan Studies 77: 273-308

External links
  Tucker, J.K. 2004 Catalog of recent and fossil turrids (Mollusca: Gastropoda). Zootaxa 682:1-1295.
 Worldwide Mollusk Data base : Mangeliidae

 
Gastropod genera